The Henry Delamater House is a historic house located at 44 Montgomery Street (US 9) in Rhinebeck, Dutchess County, New York.

Description and history 
It was designed by architect Alexander Jackson Davis and built in 1844. It is a two-story, Gothic Revival style wood frame dwelling sheathed in board and batten siding. It has a hipped roof intersected by a front gable roof and features an ornamental verandah and ornamental pointed arch with two lancet arches. Also on the property is a contributing carriage house.

It was listed in the National Register of Historic Places on May 7, 1973. It is also a contributing property in the Rhinebeck Village Historic District.

References

External links

Alexander Jackson Davis buildings
Houses on the National Register of Historic Places in New York (state)
Historic American Buildings Survey in New York (state)
Houses completed in 1844
Gothic Revival architecture in New York (state)
U.S. Route 9
Houses in Rhinebeck, New York
Individually listed contributing properties to historic districts on the National Register in New York (state)
National Register of Historic Places in Dutchess County, New York